Mircea Ciumara (13 September 1943, Călărași, Călărași County, Kingdom of Romania–14 January 2012, Bucharest, Romania) was a Romanian politician and former cabinet minister in two governments led by the Romanian Democratic Convention (CDR), the first one under Prime Minister Victor Ciorbea and the second under Mugur Isărescu. A member of the Christian Democratic National Peasants' Party (PNȚ-CD), he was a member of the Chamber of Deputies from 1992 to 2000. In the Ciorbea I Cabinet, he served as Minister of Finance from 1996 to 1997, and Minister of Industry and Commerce from 1997 to 1998. In the Isărescu I Cabinet, he was a Minister of State from 1999 to 2000.

References

1943 births
2012 deaths
Christian Democratic National Peasants' Party politicians
Members of the Chamber of Deputies (Romania)
Romanian Ministers of Finance
Romanian Ministers of Industry and Commerce
People from Călărași